Schefflera acuminatissima is a flowering plant in the family Araliaceae. it is endemic the Philippines.

References

acuminatissima
Flora of the Philippines